Orford is a village on the east coast of Tasmania, Australia 73 kilometres north-east of Hobart. It is the home of the joint champions of T20 Cricket in Tasmania. The village is centred on the mouth of the Prosser River, on the southern margin of a substantial coastal inlet called Prosser Bay. Beyond this bay are the waters of the Mercury Passage. At the 2006 census, Orford had a population of 553.

History
The town was named by Edward Walpole, who was granted 1,000 acres (4 km2) in the area in 1831.  He named his grant "Strawberry Hill", after the London residence of his relative Horace Walpole who was the Third Earl of Orford. The town was first established as a mainland port for the convict settlement on Maria Island. However, the marine infrastructure never consisted of more than a few short jetties in shallow waters just inside the mouth of the river which still remain today. The narrow channel at the river's mouth is flanked by a substantial sandbar, rendering the river unsuitable for larger vessels. The larger township of Triabunna approximately 6 km north is the main port in the area, and is home base for the region's fishing and timber industries, as well as the ferry service operating to and from Maria Island.

Shore-based bay whaling stations are believed to have operated in Prossers Bay in the 1830s.

Orford Post Office opened on 1 September 1870.

A quarry situated between Orford and Spring Beach provided sandstone for use in buildings in Hobart and Melbourne, including the Melbourne General Post Office. A quarry still operates at the nearby town of Buckland.

Environment
The weather in summer is typically warm and sunny, hence the area's popularity with holidaymakers. Winters are colder but generally mild. Rainfall is not very high but can occur at any time of the year.

The surrounding areas are generally hilly, with poor, leached soil. These tracts are in the main covered in dry eucalyptus forest. Where the soil is better, the land had been cleared and these paddocks are used to graze sheep and, to a lesser extent, to grow wheat, oats or barley. The production of grain has decreased steadily over the past fifty years as profitability has fallen.

Orford Important Bird Area
A 3 ha site consisting of a sandspit, within the 4 ha Raspins Beach Conservation Area on the northern side of the river mouth, has been identified by BirdLife International as an Important Bird Area (IBA) because it regularly supports 15-25 breeding pairs of vulnerable fairy terns.  It also supports breeding populations of red-capped (10 pairs) and hooded plovers (5-6 pairs), and pied oystercatchers (5-7 pairs). Flocks of up to 50 red-necked stints are present in summer.

The spit varies in shape and size according to the tides and outflows from the Prosser River.  It is composed mainly of bare sand within a metre of high water mark, with some patches of marram grass, and is subject to inundation by seawater during winter storms.  Both north and south of the IBA are sandy beaches used recreationally by people and their dogs, causing high levels of disturbance to nesting birds, despite attempts by the Tasmanian Parks and Wildlife Service to exclude pedestrian traffic from the site during the summer breeding season.

Population
Orford has a small permanent population of approximately 485 (2001 census), increasing to 518 (2011 census). 
The median age is 57 years old There is however a significant number of non-resident 'shack' (Australian colloquial term for weekender or holiday home) property owners who come into the area on weekends and during holiday periods.  The influx of visitors over the summer months (December to February) swells the population to over 3,000.

Despite its small size and population Orford is serviced with one supermarket, three cafes and eateries, a hotel and other accommodation, police and fire brigade, a primary school and a library.

Tourism
Orford has several clean, picturesque beaches - including Raspins, Millingons, Spring and Rheban - with a campsite at Raspins Beach. Nearby is the well-regarded 9-hole Orford Golf Course and the Darlington Vineyard. There are several walks, including the Convict Trail along the Prosser River, the coastal walk along the cliff tops between East Shelly Beach and Spring Beach, and the scenic Thumbs lookout in the nearby Wielangta Forest, which offers views of the region. Prosser Bay and the Mercury Passage provide fishing areas, with flathead, trevally, trumpeter, abalone and southern rock lobster (crayfish) sought-after species.
There are views of Maria Island from parts of Orford and nearby Spring Beach.

Sanda House. the oldest house in Orford operates as a B and B with numerous other accommodation available.

In February 2007 an artificial reef and dive site was created from the scuttling of the ship the Troy D in the Mercury Passage approximately 1 km off Maria Island, to further bolster the area's reputation as a premier location for scuba diving, thanks to its unpolluted water and abundant sea life.

Climate
Orford has an oceanic climate, with temperatures and rainfall similar to Hobart. Like most of Tasmania's east coast, Orford is prone to heatwaves in summer and may reach temperatures as high as 38 °C. Snow is very rare, however frost will be experienced several times each winter when it is not overcast or drizzling.

Louisville Point Development
The Solis residential and tourism development was approved in May 2004. The estimated A$150 million development at Louisville Point (to the north of Orford) will include 550 residential allotments, 60 'eco-tourism' cabins, a central precinct with retail shops, a day spa, restaurants and bars, and an 18-hole golf course designed by Greg Norman. Construction began in 2007 and is expected to take 10 years to complete.

References

External links

Orford/Triabunna Region Chamber of Commerce
East Coast Artificial Reef and Dive Site
Solice Tasmania
Maria Island Ferry and other information

Important Bird Areas of Tasmania
Localities of Glamorgan–Spring Bay Council
Whaling stations in Australia